{{DISPLAYTITLE:C10H8}}
The molecular formula C10H8 (molar mass: 128.17 g/mol, exact mass: 128.0626 u) may refer to:

 Azulene
 Bicyclo[6.2.0]decapentaene
 Fulvalene
 Naphthalene